The following is a list of Saturn Award winners for Best Youth-Oriented Television Series.

The award was presented annually by the Academy of Science Fiction, Fantasy and Horror Films, honoring the work of television series in science fiction, fantasy, and horror fiction, particularly those aimed at a younger audience. It was created in 2011, and discontinued in 2015 when the Saturn Award went through major changes in their television categories.

Teen Wolf won the award three times, with The 100 winning once. Teen Wolf and The Vampire Diaries hold the record for the most nominations, receiving a nomination for each of the four years it was awarded.

(NOTE: Year refers to year of eligibility, the actual ceremonies are held the following year)

The winners are listed in bold.

Winners and nominees

Multiple wins

3 awards
 Teen Wolf (consecutive)

See also
 Saturn Award for Best Action-Thriller Television Series
 Saturn Award for Best Fantasy Television Series
 Saturn Award for Best Horror Television Series
 Saturn Award for Best Network Television Series
 Saturn Award for Best Science Fiction Television Series
 Saturn Award for Best Superhero Television Series
 Saturn Award for Best Syndicated/Cable Television Series

External links
 Official site
 38th, 39th, 40th, 41st

Best Youth-Oriented Television Series